Martin Neil Rossor , is a British clinical neurologist with a specialty interest in degenerative dementias and familial disease.

Career 
He is professor emeritus and principal research associate at the UCL Queen Square Institute of Neurology, honorary consultant neurologist at the National Hospital for Neurology and Neurosurgery, and was the national director for Dementia Research for the National Institute for Health Research (NIHR) in the UK.

He was the editor of the Journal of Neurology, Neurosurgery, and Psychiatry, president of the Association of British Neurologists, director of the NIHR Clinical Research Network for Dementia and Neurodegenerative Diseases, and director of the NIHR Queen Square Dementia Biomedical Research Unit.

Research 
His collaborative work in identifying and characterising a large collection of familial cases of Alzheimer’s disease contributed to the discovery of mutations in the amyloid precursor protein gene.

His recent research focuses on general cognitive impairment in systemic disease and multimorbidity including development of the Cognitive Footprint concept, which he co-authored in 2015.

Education and professional qualifications 
Rosser attended Jesus College, Cambridge (1968-197); and King's College, Hospital Medical School (1971-1974).

He holds a Bachelor of Medicine/ Bachelor of Surgery (1974); Master of Arts (1975); is a Member of the Royal College of Physicians (1976); Doctor of Medicine (1986); and Fellow of the Royal College of Physicians (1990).

Awards 

 Bengt Winblad Lifetime Achievement Award in Alzheimer’s disease Research of the Alzheimer Association (2009)
 British Neuropsychiatry Association Medallist (2017)
 Association of British Neurology Medallist (2017)

Plenary and named lectures 

 1995 FE Williams Lecturer, Royal College of Physicians
 1999 First McDonald Critchley Lecturer, World Federation of Neurology, London
 2003 Science Today, Health tomorrow – Royal Institution of Great Britain, London
 2008 Croonian Lecturer – Royal College of Physicians
 2010 Plenary Lecture American Neurological Association
 2012 Royal Society of Medicine Stevens Lecture for the Laity
 2017 King's College London Institute of Gerontology David Hobman Lecture

Publications 
Rossor has authored nearly 900 publications. He has been on the Highly Cited Researcher list from Clarivate since 2018.

References 

20th-century British medical doctors
21st-century British medical doctors
Year of birth missing (living people)
Living people
Fellows of the Royal College of Physicians
Fellows of the Academy of Medical Sciences (United Kingdom)
British neurologists
Academics of University College London
NIHR Senior Investigators
Alumni of Jesus College, Cambridge
Alumni of King's College London
Medical journal editors